The County of St. Paul No. 19 is a municipal district in eastern central Alberta, Canada. Located in Census Division No. 12, its municipal office is located in the Town of St. Paul.

History 
It was previously known as the Municipal District of St. Paul No. 86 until January 1, 1962 when it became the County of St. Paul No. 19.

Geography

Communities and localities 
The following urban municipalities are surrounded by the County of St. Paul No. 19.
Cities
none
Towns
Elk Point
St. Paul
Villages
none
Summer villages
Horseshoe Bay

The following hamlets are located within the County of St. Paul No. 19.
Hamlets
Ashmont
Heinsburg
Lafond
Lindbergh
Lottie Lake
Mallaig
Riverview
St. Edouard
St. Lina
St. Vincent

The following localities are located within the County of St. Paul No. 19.
Localities 

Abilene
Angle Lake
Armistice
Bayview Beach
Bellevue Subdivision
Boscombe
Boyne Lake
Cameron Cove
Clarksville
Cork
Crestview Beach
Edouardville
Ferguson Flats
Floating Stone
Foisy
Frog Lake
Glen Haven
Glen On The Lake
Gratz
Hillside Estates
Lac Bellevue
Lac Canard
Lac St. Cyr
Lake Eliza
Linkewich Trailer Court

Lower Therien Lake
McLeod Beach
McRae
Middle Creek
Muriel
Northern Valley
Norway Valley
Owlseye
Owlseye Lake
Pine Meadow
Plateau Estates
Pratch Subdivision
Primrose
Primula
Riel
Springpark
St. Brides
St. Paul Beach
Stony Lake
Sugden
Sunset Beach
Terence View Estates
Whitney Lake Mobile Home Park

Demographics 

In the 2016 Census of Population conducted by Statistics Canada, the County of St. Paul No. 19 had a population of 6,036 living in 2,334 of its 3,562 total private dwellings, a  change from its 2011 population of 5,826.

See also 
List of communities in Alberta
List of municipal districts in Alberta

References

External links 

 
St. Paul